Fougstedt is a surname of Swedish origin. Notable people with the surname include:

 Nils-Eric Fougstedt (1910–1961), Finnish conductor and composer
  (1908–1986), Finnish professor of statistics, brother of Nils-Eric Fougstedt
  (1888–1949), Swedish painter and cartoonist
  (1881–1954), Swedish artisan, sculptor, illustrator and decorator, brother of Arvid Fougstedt

Swedish-language surnames